Banyuls-sur-Mer is a commune in the Pyrénées-Orientales department in southern France. It was first settled by Greeks starting in 400 BCE.

Geography

Location 
Banyuls-sur-Mer is located in the canton of La Côte Vermeille and in the arrondissement of Céret.

Banyuls-sur-Mer is neighbored by Cerbère, Port-Vendres, Argelès-sur-Mer and Collioure on its French borders, and by Espolla, Rabós, Colera and Portbou on its Spanish borders. The foothills of Pyrenees, the Monts Albères, run into the Mediterranean Sea in Banyuls-sur-Mer, creating a steep cliff line.

Toponymy
Banyuls-sur-Mer was first mentioned in 981 as Balneum or Balneola. In 1197, the town was mentioned as Banullis de Maredine and in 1674. In Catalan, it has been called Banyuls de la Marenda since the 19th century.

The name Banyuls indicates the presence of a pond. In fact, a pond did exist in Banyuls-sur-Mer until the creek Vallauria was drained in 1872. The term Marenda in Catalan or sur Mer in French merely indicates the proximity to the coast.

History 

In the 20th century Banyuls-sur-Mer was the site of a camp housing Republican escapees from Spain at the end of the Spanish Civil War.

Government and politics

Mayors

International relations
Banyuls-sur-Mer is twinned with Settle, North Yorkshire, United Kingdom and also with the town of Kralupy nad Vltavou in the Central Bohemian Region of the Czech Republic.

Demography

Sports
 Banyuls-sur-Mer is at the eastern end of the GR 10 long-distance footpath.
 Banyuls is a centre for scuba diving. The main dive site of the area is the marine reserve at Cap Rederis. Local dive schools offer excellent facilities.
 Sea kayaking is also available here.

Economy
For nearly two centuries, the smuggling of goods to and from Spain was a major activity in Banyuls-sur-Mer. Depending on the needs of the time, salt, tobacco, silver, sugar, rice, textiles, and leather were smuggled through this city, almost always with impunity. Otherwise the inhabitants lived mainly from fishing and viticulture. Nowadays, tourism stemming from the wine industry plays a significant economic role in the town, notably for delicious and rare red dessert wines. Under the Collioure appellation, the town is also a centre of quality dry reds, rosés and whites, with a number of producers of naturally sweet wines.

George Orwell and his wife Eileen had a holiday in Banyuls-sur-Mer directly after leaving Spain, then in the throes of its civil war, in July 1937. Their holiday was not a success. As he noted, Orwell found the place 'a bore and a disappointment'. It was chilly weather, a persistent wind blew off the sea, the water was dull and choppy....

Sites of interest
 Musée Maillol Banyuls-sur-Mer, a private museum at the farm of the sculptor Aristide Maillol where he is buried.

Sculptures by Aristide Maillol in Banyuls-sur-Mer

Notable people
 Aristide Maillol (1861-1944), French sculptor and painter, born and died in Banyuls-sur-Mer. Maillol was very much part of the turn of the century art scene, friends with Matisse, Derrain, Picasso, Dalí. A sculpture of Dina Vierny, aged 17, his last muse, model, and member of the French Resistance, stands beneath the huge jacaranda tree behind the town hall.
 Emil Racoviță (1868-1947), Romanian polar explorer, former co-director of the Arago laboratory.
 Jean de La Hire (1878-1956), writer born in Banyuls-sur-Mer.
 Marc Eyraud (1924-2005), actor, died in Banyuls-sur-Mer.
 Nils Seethaler (*1981), German cultural anthropologist, spent parts of his childhood in Banyuls-sur-Mer.

See also
Communes of the Pyrénées-Orientales department

References

External links

Official website

 
Communes of Pyrénées-Orientales
Northern Catalonia
Populated coastal places in France